The 2011–12 Rice Owls men's basketball team represented Rice University during the 2011–12 NCAA Division I men's basketball season. The Owls, led by fourth year head coach Ben Braun, played their home games at the Tudor Fieldhouse and are members of Conference USA. They finished the season 19–16, 8–8 in C-USA to finish in seventh place. They lost in the first round of the C-USA Basketball tournament to East Carolina. They were invited to the 2012 CollegeInsider.com Tournament where they defeated Louisiana in the first round and Drake in the second round before falling in the quarterfinals to Oakland.

Roster

Schedule

|-
!colspan=9| Regular season

|-
!colspan=9| 2012 Conference USA men's basketball tournament

|-
!colspan=9| 2012 CIT

References

Rice Owls men's basketball seasons
Rice
Rice